Boarmacaria is a genus of moths in the family Geometridae.

Species
 Boarmacaria herbuloti Holloway, 1993
 Boarmacaria tenuilinea (Warren, 1900)

References
 Boarmacaria at Markku Savela's Lepidoptera and Some Other Life Forms
Natural History Museum Lepidoptera genus database

Boarmiini